Cordell Hull (1871–1955) was a U.S. Senator from Tennessee. Senator Hull may also refer to:

George W. Hull (1870–1951), Wisconsin State Senate
Laurens Hull (1779–1865), New York State Senate
Morton D. Hull (1867–1937), Illinois State Senate
T. Clark Hull (1921–1996), Connecticut State Senate
William Hull (1753–1825), Massachusetts State Senate